Militão Bessa Ribeiro, (13 August 1896 – 2 January 1950) born in Murça, was a Portuguese politician, member of the Portuguese Communist Party, during the illegality, that struggled against the fascist regime of Estado Novo.

After the death of the former General Secretary of the Party, Bento Gonçalves, in the Concentration camp of Tarrafal, in Portuguese Cape Verde, Militão Ribeiro initiated, along with Álvaro Cunhal and Júlio Fogaça, a major reorganization of the Party, in the early 1940s. Such reorganization, based on the Leninist principles, transformed the Party in the major reference of the resistance against the regime.

In 1949, Ribeiro was arrested by the political police, the PIDE, and imprisoned in the penitentiary of Lisbon. Ribeiro would die shortly after, a victim of beatings and liver problems in captivity. Before dying, he managed to send a letter to some Party comrades, written with his own blood.

References

 *https://www.pcp.pt/sites/default/files/documentos/brochura_militao.pdf

1896 births
People from Murça
1950 deaths
Portuguese anti-fascists
Portuguese Communist Party politicians
Portuguese people who died in prison custody
Prisoners who died in Portuguese detention
People who died on hunger strike